Ranigaon is a village of Makrana in Nagaur district, Rajasthan.It is almost 35 km away from Makrana towards Nagaur.

 
The Makrana Panchayat Smiti member from the Village is Shri Mahipal Singh..Thakur Shri.Abhay Singh Rathore who  was the First Sarpanch of Ranigaon village & he was served as a Sarpanch 30 year continues

References

Villages in Nagaur district